The International Inline Skater Hockey Federation (IISHF) is an international sporting federation that internationally organizes inline skater hockey. Each of the current 10 member federations are the national governing inline skater hockey bodies in their countries.

The IISHF organizes up to 10 annual international Title Events. These are 7 Club tournaments named "European Cups", mainly for the champions and vice champions of the national leagues, and 3 "European Championships" for the national teams of their member federations.

Inline Skater Hockey

Inline skater hockey is a roller sport and team sport. It is similar to inline hockey, with the most noticeable difference of using a plastic ball instead of a puck. While primarily played using inline skates, quad skates (such as found in rink hockey) are allowed.

A game is played by two teams, and each team is permitted to have 5 players on the pitch, usually four outfield players and a goalkeeper. The rink (40m x 20m) is divided in two halves with a goal in each end. A standard game lasts 3 periods of 20 minutes each. At international tournaments the lengths of the games may deviate, depending on the amount of participating teams.

Like ice hockey, inline skater hockey is a contact sport and has a similar set of rules of the game with few noticeable variations. These mainly derive from the much smaller standard rink size (800 m2 compared to 1,800 m2 in ice hockey). In skater hockey the game is played with no "offside" and no "icing", a "free hit" instead of a bully. Lastly physical contact is slightly limited and referees show yellow, red and black cards. Fighting is strictly forbidden and severely punished.

IISHF Member Countries 

Former Member Countries

IISHF European Championships 
IISHF European Championships are international Title Events (class A tournaments) for national teams. In general each member country has the right to one spot at each IISHF European Championship. A European Championship can only take place with teams from a minimum of four (4) different nations. From these minimum 4 nations at least two nations had to be placed on place 1 – 4 at the previous European Championship. European Championships take place every year in the months from September to November (both months included).

Being an independent sport the European Championships are conducted in Autumn at the end of most national skater hockey seasons. They are also conducted in a time when ice hockey players have returned to ice and are commonly unable to participate. This serves to underline the sport being independent and avoids manifesting a sport hierarchy as in ice hockey.

Men European Championship (MCH) 
The Men European Championship has been played 21 times in the history of skater hockey. In 2020 and 2021 they were cancelled to the COVID-19 pandemic. The four nations Denmark, Germany, Great Britain, and Switzerland participated in all Men European Championships since 1997. The 2023 Men European Championship will take place from 16. - 19.11.2023 in Givisiez, Switzerland. 

Men European Championships Historical Medal Ranking

U19 European Championships (U19CH) 
The U19 European Championships have been played 22 times in the history of skater hockey. In 2020 and 2021 they were cancelled to the COVID-19 pandemic. The 2023 U19 European Championship will take place from 01. - 03.09.2023 in Amstetten, Austria.  

U19 European Championships Historical Medal Ranking

Women European Championships (WCH) 
The Women European Championships (WCH) have been played 10 times in the history of skater hockey. Since 2009 the IISHF and its Member Fedederations have not agreed on conducting a WCH.

Women European Championships Historical Medal Ranking

To date only the national teams from Germany (8) and Denmark (2) were able to win the Women European Championships.

IISHF European Championships Nations' Ranking 
This historical ranking includes all medals collected as a result of all three European Championships (men, women, men U19).

IISHF European Cups 
IISHF European Cups are international Title Events (class A tournaments) for club teams, most commonly the champions, vice champions and national cup winners in 6 age categories (U13, U16, U19, Senior, Veteran, Masters). These tournaments serve as a key motivator to win national competitions. In general each member country has the right to one spot at each IISHF European Cup.

A European Cup can only take place with a minimum of 8 teams from a minimum of three (3) different Nations. All European Cups should take place from April until the first weekend of July or the last two weekends of August except the weekends of Easter and Whitsun which are reserved only for class B tournaments.

IISHF Men European Cup (MEC) 
The Men European Cup is the highest club title any Men club team can win, e.g. it corresponds to the Champions League in football. The Cup is played every year during one weekend with games from Friday until Sunday. Each team plays 6 to 8 games during these three days. Since 1998 a total of 22 Men European Cups were played. The 2020 and 2021 Men European Cups were cancelled due to the COVI9-19 pandemic. The 2023 Men European Cup will take place from 23. - 25.06.2023 in Kaarst, Germany.

IISHF Men European Cup Historical Medal Ranking (Clubs) 
5 Clubs in the 22 years' history of the IISHF Men European Cup have won the Men European Cup 3 times. To date, Denmark's "Vesterbro Starz" Men team have earned the most medals (7). Germany's "Duisburg Ducks" and "Köln-West Rheinos" follow with 6 medals each.

IISHF Men European Cup Historical Ranking (Countries) 
To date 11 different teams from 4 countries have won the main European club title for Men Teams and 17 different teams from 4 countries have earned a medal (gold, silver, bronze). The countries of the medalists are Germany, Denmark, Switzerland and Great Britain.

IISHF Men Challenge Cup (MCC) 
In June 2011 the IISHF held its first "Men Invitation Cup" for second-tier teams which had not won their domestic championships but rather finished second, third and fourth places, alike the UEFA Europa League in football. Starting 2013 the Men Invitation Cup was reorganized into a "Cup Winners Cup" and designed in a way that the winners of national cup competitions would automatically qualify alike the UEFA Cup Winners Cup in football. Starting 2018 IISHF redesigned this tournament back into the format of the "Men Invitation Cup" but named it "IISHF Men Challenge Cup" as the focus was on inviting teams to international games to help them challenge heir national title holders domestically. This tournament basically corresponds to the IIHF Continental Cup.

The Cup is played every year during one weekend with games from Friday until Sunday. Each team plays 6 to 8 games during these three days. Since 2011 a total of 10 Men European Challenge Cups were played. The 2020 and 2021 Men Challenge Cups were cancelled due to the COVI9-19 pandemic. The 2023 Men Challenge Cup will take place from 16. - 18.06..2023 in Avenches, Switzerland.

IISHF Men Challenge Historical Medal Ranking (Clubs) 
3 Clubs in the 9 years' history of the IISHF Men Challenge Cup have won this European title. 15 different clubs have earned a medal in this IISHF Title Event. To date, Germany's  "Rockets Essen" have earned the most medals (5). Switzerlands "Bienne Seelanders" follows with 4 medals and "Rolling Aventicum"  2 medals each.

IISHF Men Challenge Historical Ranking (Countries) 
To date 3 clubs from 2 countries have won the second European club title for Men Teams and 12 different teams from 6 countries have earned a medal (gold, silver, bronze). The countries of the medalists are Germany, Switzerland, Great Britain, Denmark, Austria and the Netherlands.

IISHF Women European Cup (WEC) 
Starting 2001 IISHF has conducted the Women European Cup for 16 times. It is the highest club title any Women club team can win, e.g. it corresponds to the Champions League in football. The Cup is played every year during one weekend with games from Friday until Sunday. Each plays 6 to 8 games during these three days.   

The 2020 Women European Cup was cancelled due to the COVI9-19 pandemic. The 2023 Women European Championship will take place from 19. - 21.05.2023 in Rossemaison, Switzerland.

IISHF Women European Cup Historical Ranking (Clubs) 
12 Clubs in the 16 years' history of the IISHF Women European Cup have won this European title. 22 teams have won a medal (gold, silver, bronze) in the IISHF Women European Cup history. To date, Germany's  "Mendener Mambas" have earned the most medals (8). Denmarks "Vesterbro Starz" follows with 6 medals and Austria's "Red Dragons Altenberg" and Germany's "Düsseldorf Rams" follow with 4 medals each.

IISHF Women European Cup Historical Ranking (Countries) 
To date teams from 4 countries have won the main European club title and teams from 5 countries have earned a medal (gold, silver, bronze). The countries of the medalists are Denmark, Germany, Austria, Switzerland and Great Britain.

IISHF U19 European Cup (U19EC) 

Starting 2000 IISHF has conducted the U19 European Cup for 18 times.  It is the highest club title any U19 club team can win, e.g. it corresponds to the Champions League in football. The Cup is played every year during one weekend with games from Friday until Sunday. Each team plays 6 to 8 games during these three days. At the U19 European Cup male players aged 16 to 18 and female players aged 16 to 19 are entitled to play. Exclusions are made for 1-year overaged players if, and only if, they were on the roster for the particular team in the domestic championship during which the team qualified itself for the European Cup. 

The 2020 and 2021 U19 European Cups were cancelled due to the COVI9-19 pandemic. In 2023 there will be no U19 European Cup due to a lack of a hosting club.

IISHF U19 European Cup Historical Ranking (Clubs) 
11 Clubs in the 18 years' history of the IISHF U19 European Cup have won this European title. 23 different clubs teams have won a medal (gold, silver, bronze)  in this IISHF Title tournament. To date, the most successful club in this age category is "Crash Eagles Kaarst", winning 4 Titles and earning 6 medals. Switzerlands  "SHC Rossemaison" with 2 titles and 7 medals is the second most successful club, followed by Switzerlands "Bienne Seelanders" with 2 titles and 6 medals.

IISHF U19 European Cup Historical Ranking (Countries) 
To date teams from 4 countries have won the main European club title and teams from 5 countries have earned a medal (gold, silver, bronze). The countries of the medalists are Denmark, Germany, Austria, Switzerland and Great Britain.

IISHF U16 European Cup (U16EC) 

Starting 2001 IISHF organized the U16 European Cup for 19 times. It is the highest club title any U16 club team can win, e.g. it corresponds to the Champions League in football. The Cup is played every year during one weekend with games from Friday until Sunday. Each team plays 6 to 8 games during these three days.

At the U16 European Cup male players aged 13 to 15 and female players aged 13 to 16 are entitled to play. Exclusions are made for 1-year overaged players if, and only if, they were on the roster for the particular team in the domestic championship during which the team qualified itself for the European Cup. 

The 2020 and 2021 U16 European Cups were cancelled due to the COVI9-19 pandemic. The 2023 U16 European Cup will take place from 18. - 20.08.2023 in Rossemaison, Switzerland.

IISHF U16 European Cup Historical Ranking (Clubs) 
12 Clubs in the 19 years' history of the IISHF U16 European Cup have won this European title. 23 different clubs teams have earned a medal (gold, silver, bronze) in this IISHF Title tournament. To date, the most successful club in this age category is "Crash Eagles Kaarst", winning 4 Titles and earning 6 medals. Germany's "Crefelder SC" with 2 titles and 5 medals is the second most successful club, followed by Denmark's "Gentofte Aligators" with 2 titles and 4 medals.

IISHF U16 European Cup Historical Ranking (Countries) 
To date teams from 4 countries have won the main European club title and teams from 5 countries have earned a medal (gold, silver, bronze). The countries of the medalists are Denmark, Germany, Austria, Switzerland and Great Britain.

IISHF U13 European Cup (U13EC) 

Starting 2000 IISHF organized the U13 European Cup for 21 times. It is the highest club title any U13 club team can win, e.g. it corresponds to the Champions League in football. The Cup is played every year during one weekend with games from Friday until Sunday. Each team plays 6 to 8 games during these three days. At the U13 European Cup male players aged 10 to 12 and female players aged 10 to 13 are entitled to play. Exclusions are made for 1-year overaged players if, and only if, they were on the roster for their particular team in the national championship which qualified for the European Cup. 

The 2020 and 2021 U13 European Cups were cancelled due to the COVI9-19 pandemic. The 2023 U13 European Cup will take place from 28. - 30.04.2023 in Givisiez, Switzerland. .

IISHF U13 European Cup Historical Ranking (Clubs) 
16 Clubs in the 20 years' history of the IISHF U13 European Cup have won this European title. 29 different clubs teams have earned a medal (gold, silver, bronze) in this IISHF Title tournament. To date, Russia's  "Leader 1420 Moscow" leads the ranking with 2 Gold and 1 Silver medals. Denmarks "Copenhagen" follows with 2 Gold and 1 Bronze medals before Denmarks "Gentofte Alligators" with 2 Gold medals.

IISHF U13 European Cup Historical Ranking (Countries) 
To date teams from 6 countries have won the main European club title and teams from 8 countries have earned a medal (gold, silver, bronze). The countries of the medalists are Denmark, Great Britain, Germany, Switzerland, Russian Federation and Austria.

IISHF Veteran European Cup (VEC) 

Starting 2013 IISHF organized the Veteran European Cup for 6 times. It is the highest club title any Veteran club team can win, e.g. it corresponds to the Champions League in football. The Cup is played every year during one weekend with games from Friday until Sunday. Each team plays 6 to 8 games during these three days.

The 2020 Veteran European Cup was cancelled due to the COVI9-19 pandemic. As in 2022 and 2023 no VEC was / will be conducted due to a lack of a hosting club.

IISHF Veteran European Cup Historical Ranking (Clubs) 
3 Clubs in the 6 years' history of the IISHF Veteran European Cup have won this European title. To date, Denmarks "Copenhagen Vikings" have earned the most medals (5). Switzerland's "Rossemaison" follow with 1 Gold medal and 1 Bronze Medal before "Rolling Aventicum" with 1 Gold medal. 11 teams have won a medal (gold, silver, bronze) in the IISHF Veteran European Cup history.

IISHF Veteran European Cup Historical Ranking (Countries) 
To date teams from 2 countries have won the main European club title and teams from 4 countries have earned a medal (gold, silver, bronze). The countries of the medalists are Denmark, Switzerland, Germany, and Austria.

European Cups Historical Ranking (Clubs) 
The below table depicts the ranking of all European clubs in accordance with the amount of titles and medals won in all 7 IISHF European Cups (Men, Men Challenge, Women, U10, U13, U16, U19, Veteran) over their entire history.

IISHF European Cups Nations' Ranking 
This historical ranking includes all medals collected per country as a result of all 7 European Cups (Men, Men Challenge, Women, U13, U16, U19, Veteran) over their entire history.

IISHF Nations' Ranking (European Cups & Championships) 
This historical ranking includes all medals collected per country as a result of all 3 European Championships (Men, Women, U19)  and all 7 European Cups (Men, Men Challenge, Women, U13, U16, U19, Veteran) and Nations Cups over their entire history.

See also 
 Hockey
 Roller hockey
 Roller in-line hockey
 Roller hockey (quad)
 Ice hockey

References

External links
IISHF, International Inline-Skater hockey Federation
ISHD, The National Governing Body for Skater Hockey in Germany
BiSHA, The National Governing Body for Skater Hockey in Great Britain
FSIH, The Swiss Inline Hockey Federation
ISHU, The National Governing Body of Skater Hockey in Ukraine
Vesterbro Starz, European champions 2004 & 2006

Inline hockey